Gonal is a panchayat village in the southern state of Karnataka, India. Administratively, Gonal is under the Shahapur Taluka of Yadgir district in Karnataka.  It lies on the left (east) bank of the Krishna River. Gonal is 9 km by road southeast of the village of Bendebembli and 13 km by road southwest of the village of Badiyal. The nearest rail station is Chegunda Station and the nearest railhead is in Yadgir.

There are nine villages in the gram panchayat: Gonal, Agnihal,  Gundloor, Joldhadgi, Konganda Simt Wadgera, Sangam, Shivenoor, Shivepur, and Sugoor.

Demographics 
 census, Gonal had 853 inhabitants, with 415 males and 438 females.

Notes

External links 
 

Villages in Yadgir district